Ghalat (also Romanized as Qalāt) is a village in Ghalat Rural District, Evaz County, Fars Province, Iran. At the 2017 census, its population was 
872, in 200families.

References 

Populated places in Evaz County